The women's 1500 metres race of the 2014–15 ISU Speed Skating World Cup 3, arranged in Sportforum Hohenschönhausen, in Berlin, Germany, was held on 7 December 2014.

Ireen Wüst of the Netherlands won, followed by Heather Richardson of the United States in second place, and Marrit Leenstra of the Netherlands in third place. Antoinette de Jong of the Netherlands won Division B.

Results
The race took place on Sunday, 7 December, with Division B scheduled in the morning session, at 10:05, and Division A scheduled in the afternoon session, at 12:50.

Division A

Division B

References

Women 1500
3